The 1967 Grand Prix motorcycle racing season was the 19th F.I.M. Road Racing World Championship Grand Prix season. The season consisted of thirteen Grand Prix races in six classes: 500cc, 350cc, 250cc, 125cc, 50cc and Sidecars 500cc. It began on 30 April, with Spanish Grand Prix and ended with Japanese Grand Prix on 15 October.

Season summary
A seminal year in motorcycle Grand Prix history as well as the end of an era with Honda making the decision to withdraw its racing program from competition. Nevertheless, Honda would go out with a bang, with Mike Hailwood taking the 250 cc and 350 cc crowns and coming within a whisker of dethroning Giacomo Agostini for the 500 cc title.

Honda decided to concentrate on the larger classes leaving Suzuki to dominate the 50 cc class with Anscheidt again the champion. The improved Yamahas took the 125 cc class with Bill Ivy finishing ahead of teammate Phil Read.

In the 250 cc class, Read would battle Hailwood mightily for the title. They both finished the season with 50 points but Hailwood took the title because he had five wins to Read's four. In the 350 cc class, Hailwood had an easier time, taking six wins and claiming the crown by mid-season.

The 500 title fight would be one for the ages with Agostini and Hailwood swapping wins back and forth including a legendary duel at the Isle of Man TT. The chase went down to the last race in Canada. Hailwood won there to tie Agostini on points. Each rider had five wins so it came down to second places- Agostini taking the title with three seconds to Hailwood's two.

With Honda's pullout, Hailwood left motorcycle racing to take up a car racing career. He left with a blaze of glory, winning three classes in one day at the Dutch TT as well as three classes in one week at the Isle of Man TT.

1967 Grand Prix season calendar

Standings

Scoring system
Points were awarded to the top six finishers in each race.  Only the best of four were counted on 50cc championships, best of six in 350cc and 500cc championships, best of seven in 125cc and 250cc championships, while in the Sidecars, the best of five races were counted.

500cc final standings

350cc final standings

250cc final standings

125cc final standings

50cc final standings

References

 Büla, Maurice & Schertenleib, Jean-Claude (2001). Continental Circus 1949-2000. Chronosports S.A. 

Grand Prix motorcycle racing seasons
Grand Prix motorcycle racing season